Corvulus (also Corvolus) was the Duke of Friuli for a brief spell in the early eighth century AD (probably 705 or 706). He replaced Ferdulf, but he offended King Aripert II and was arrested and his eyes gouged out. He lived in obscurity and shame as a blind exile thereafter, according to Paul the Deacon. He was ultimately replaced by Pemmo.

"Corvulus" literally means "little raven" in Latin, so this may have been a hypocoristic or Latinization for the Duke's real birth name (as a likely ethnic Lombard who assimilated to Italo-Roman culture).

Sources
 Paul the Deacon. Historia Langobardorum. Translated by William Dudley Foulke. University of Pennsylvania: 1907.
 Hodgkin, Thomas. Italy and her Invaders. Clarendon Press: 1895.

Dukes of Friuli
8th-century rulers in Europe
8th-century Lombard people
7th-century births
8th-century deaths